The following is a list of awards and nominations received by Bryan Cranston.

Major associations

Academy Awards

BAFTA Awards

Emmy Awards (Primetime)

Golden Globe Awards

Laurence Olivier Awards

Screen Actors Guild Awards

Tony Awards

Other associations

Annie Awards
The Annie Awards are accolades presented annually by the Los Angeles branch of the International Animated Film Association, ASIFA-Hollywood since 1972, to recognize excellence in animation in film and television. Originally designed to celebrate lifetime or career contributions to animation, since 1992 it has given awards to individual films. Cranston has been awarded once.

Critics' Choice Awards
The Critics' Choice Television Awards and Critics' Choice Movie Awards have been presented annually since 1995 for outstanding achievements in the film, TV and documentary industries. Cranston has received two awards out of four nominations.

Critics' Circle Theatre Awards 
The Critics’ Circle Theatre Awards, founded in 1989, are run by the Drama Section of The Critics’ Circle, which has existed since 1913 to 'protect and promote cultural criticism in the UK'. Cranston has been awarded once.

Directors Guild of America
The Directors Guild of America (DGA) is an entertainment guild which represents the interests of film and television directors in the United States motion picture industry and abroad. Founded as the Screen Directors Guild in 1936, the group merged with the Radio and Television Directors Guild in 1960 to become the modern Directors Guild of America. Cranston has received three nominations.

Drama Desk Awards

Hollywood Critics Association
The Hollywood Critics Association (HCA) is a film critic organization in Los Angeles, California. Cranston has received one nomination.

Hollywood Film Awards
The Hollywood Film Awards is an annual film festival which takes place in Los Angeles, California. The Festival was established in 1997 by author producer Carlos de Abreu and his wife, model Janice Pennington. The Hollywood Film Festival was created to make a connection between established Hollywood studios, independent filmmakers and the global creative community. Cranston has been awarded once.

Monte-Carlo Television Festival
The Festival de Télévision de Monte-Carlo is an international festival and competition focusing on productions for television, founded 1961 and based in Monaco. Cranston has been awarded once.

People's Choice Awards
The People's Choice Awards is an American awards show, recognizing the people and the work of popular culture, voted on by the general public. Cranston has received one nomination.

Phoenix Film Critics Society Awards
Phoenix Film Critics Society Awards are film awards given by the Phoenix Film Critics Society (PFCS), an association of publication reviewers based on the city of Phoenix, Arizona. Cranston has received two nominations.

Prism Awards

Satellite Awards
The Satellite Awards are annual awards given by the International Press Academy that are commonly noted in entertainment industry journals and blogs. Cranston has received five awards from eight nominations.

Saturn Awards
The Saturn Award is an award presented annually by the Academy of Science Fiction, Fantasy and Horror Films to honor the top works mainly in science fiction, fantasy, and horror in film, television, and home video. Cranston has received two awards from seven nominations.

San Diego Film Critics Society Awards
The San Diego Film Critics Society, an organization of film reviewers in San Diego, was founded in 1996 to award films. Cranston has received two nomination.

Television Critics Association Awards
The Television Critics Association Awards are awards presented by the Television Critics Association in recognition of excellence in television. Cranston has received one award from seven nominations.

Footnotes

References

External links
 

Cranston, Bryan